Marcus Thomas may refer to:

 Marcus Thomas (defensive tackle) (born 1985), for the Denver Broncos
 Marcus Thomas (running back) (born 1984), free agent
 Marcus Thomas (actor), film actor
 Marcus Thomas (boxer) (born 1970)

See also
 Marc Thomas (disambiguation)